Sorbus reducta (铺地花楸), the dwarf Chinese mountain ash, is a species of flowering plant in the family Rosaceae, native to western China (South West Sichuan and North West Yunnan}. White flowers in spring are followed by red or pink, and then white berries in autumn. 

The Latin specific epithet reducta means "dwarf", referring to its compact habit.

This plant has gained the Royal Horticultural Society's Award of Garden Merit.

Lower taxa
Sorbus reducta var. pubescens
Sorbus reducta var. reducta

References

Flora of China
reducta